Indicator may refer to:

Biology 
 Environmental indicator of environmental health (pressures, conditions and responses)
 Ecological indicator of ecosystem health (ecological processes)
 Health indicator, which is used to describe the health of a population
 Honeyguides, also known as "indicator birds", a family of Old World tropical birds 
 Indicator (genus), a genus of birds in the honeyguide family
 Indicator species, a species that defines a characteristic of an environment
 Indicator bacteria, bacteria used to detect and estimate the level of fecal contamination of water
 Indicator organism, organisms used to measure such things as potential fecal contamination of environmental samples
 Indicator plant, a plant that acts as a measure of environmental conditions
 Indicator value, one of two terms in ecology referring to the classification of organisms
 Iodine–starch test, a method to test for the presence of starch or iodine.

Chemistry 
 Complexometric indicator, a chemical detector for metal ions in complexometric titrations.
 Humidity indicator card, a card impregnated with chemicals that change colour when a particular humidity is exceeded.
 pH indicator, a chemical detector for protons in acid-base titrations.
 Redox indicator, a chemical detector for redox titrations.
 Zeta potential, a property of interfaces in fluids for Zeta potential titration.

Economics 
 Economic indicator
 Performance indicator
 Technical indicator, a tool used in the technical analysis of financial securities

Mathematics, engineering, and industry 
 Indicator (distance amplifying instrument), any of various instruments used to accurately measure small distances, and amplify them to make them more obvious
 Indicator (metadata), a Boolean value that may contain only the values true or false and includes the meaning of these values
 Indicator (statistics), a concept in statistics, research design and social sciences
 Indicator diagram, a graph of pressure against stroke within a piston engine
 Indicator function of a subset of the domain, a concept in mathematics
 Indicator net, nets anchored at various depths to the sea bed around Allied naval bases during World War II intended to entangle U-boat traffic of the enemy
 Indicator of compromise, an artifact observed in computer forensics that indicates an intrusion

Other uses 
 Indicator (Deine Lakaien album), 2010
 Indicator (Onward to Olympas album), 2012
 Indicator Island, in the Argentine Islands of Antarctica
 The Indicator (1819–1821), a weekly literary journal edited by Leigh Hunt
 The Indicator, a daily podcast produced by Planet Money
 A synonym for the turn signal of an automobile